Ronald McCaffer (born 1943) is Emeritus Professor of Construction Management at Loughborough University in Loughborough, England. He is a specialist in the management of the processes, technology, contractual and procurement systems of the construction industry.

Biography

Early life and education
McCaffer was born in Glasgow, Scotland. He received a BSc in Civil Engineering from Strathclyde University in 1965. He was awarded PhD in 1977 from Loughborough University and DSc in 1998 from University of Strathclyde.

Academics career
At Loughborough University, McCaffer has been Head of Civil Engineering (1987–1993), Dean of Engineering (1992–1997), Deputy Vice-Chancellor (1997–2002), Director of Strategic Business Partnerships, Innovation and Knowledge Transfer (2002–2006), and Emeritus Professor (since 2009).

Other appointments have included duties at the University of Technology, Malaysia, University of Hong Kong, University of New South Wales and visiting Professor at Glasgow Caledonian University.

Honours
McCaffer is a Fellow of the Royal Academy of Engineering (1991), Fellow of the Royal Society of Edinburgh (2009), Fellow of the Royal Academy of Engineering, Fellow of the Institution of Civil Engineers and Fellow of the Chartered Institute of Building.

He is a member of the Board of Trustees of the British University in Egypt, and previously a member of Innovation East Midlands, a member of the Engineering Construction Industry Training Board and member of Court at Cranfield University.

Books
Modern Construction Management
Management of Off Highway Plant and Equipment
Worked Examples in Construction Management

External links
Home page *MERIT the international construction business game *Modern Construction Management

Academics of Loughborough University
Scottish civil engineers
Fellows of the Royal Academy of Engineering
People associated with Cranfield University
1943 births
Living people